

Arthropods

Cephalopods
Three new species of extinct Octopoda discovered in 2009. The species – Keuppia hyperbolaris, Keuppia levante, and Styletoctopus annae – lived about 95 million years ago, and bear a strong resemblance to modern octopuses, suggesting that the Octopoda order has remained relatively unchanged for tens of millions of years. The fossils included evidence of arms, muscles, rows of suckers, ink, and internal gills. The discovery was made by a team led by Dirk Fuchs of the Freie University, which is located at Berlin, Germany. The fossils were found at Hakel and Hadjoula, Lebanon. Various new ammonoid taxa were named, including Ivoites.

Cartilaginous fish

Bony fish

Amphibians

Newly named amphibians

Basal reptiles

Newly named basal reptiles

Turtles

Newly named turtles

Archosauromorphs

Basal archosauromorphs

Archosaurs

Lepidosauromorphs

Basal lepidosauromorphs

Plesiosaurs

In 2009, in Svalbard, Norway a new pliosaur was found by Jorn Hurum. It currently is codenamed as "Predator X."

Squamates

Synapsids

Non-mammalian

Mammals

Plants

Angiosperms

Relevant research in other sciences

Evolutionary biology
 A study is published that proposes that females from certain taxa use ornaments as a criterion for mate choice because other dimorphic structures, like biological "weaponry" could be used to coerce or force them to mate.
 A study concludes that biotic factors have more pronounced local and short term evolutionary impacts than abiotic factors, which in turn have a more pronounced effect through time and on biodiversity as a whole.

Extinction
A study noting the effects of the KT mass extinction on Earth's modern biota is published.

Geology

Ichnology

Paleobiogeography

Paleoecology

Footnotes

Complete author list
As science becomes more collaborative, papers with large numbers of authors are becoming more common. To prevent the deformation of the tables, these footnotes list the contributors to papers that erect new genera and have many authors.

References